The Spice of Life was a 13-episode television series produced by Blackrod Ltd. and aired by Channel 4 in 1983, with narration by actor Edward Woodward. Each half-hour episode covered a different cooking spice or herb, including information on how it grows and is used in various locations around the world; showing several dishes using that spice.

Episodes
Episode titles are not given on-screen, but are derived from Channel 4 press packs.

1. The Spices of India (7 Sep 1983)

2. Cinnamon (14 Sep 1983)

3. Pepper (21 Sep 1983)

4. Mustard (28 Sep 1983)

5. Cloves (5 Oct 1983)

6. Saffron (12 Oct 1983)

7. Curry Around the World (19 Oct 1983)

8. Chillies (26 Oct 1983)

9. Herbs (2 Nov 1983)

10. Garlic (9 Nov 1983)

11. More Pepper (16 Nov 1983)

12. Allspice (23 Nov 1983)

13. Nutmeg (30 Nov 1983)

References

External links
 

1983 British television series debuts
1983 British television series endings
1980s British documentary television series
Channel 4 documentaries
Food travelogue television series
English-language television shows